Doddathota is a small place near Sullia in the Indian state of Karnataka. It belongs to the village named Amaramudnooru. Here you can observe several Central government/State government establishments. The peoples here are friendly in nature. They are belongs to the group of farmers.

Here the people are growing mainly arecanut, coconut, black pepper, banana and rubber crops. Here you can see a school which introduced in the 1950s. Its name is Government upgraded school Doddathota. Here there is a branch of nationalised bank is also serving to the people.

In this area you can see a Sub post office, an agricultural co-operative bank branch and a NGO Udbhav rural education and health development trust.
This is also the gateway of Markanja a village recently famous on anti corruption campaign. Here you can see two doctors who serving for the better health in rural people. One is Dr P V S Rao and another Dr J P Pare. Now Udbhav rural education and health development trust is also working in the same way. It has a mobile unit of doctors who are ready to serve in rural areas. Its mobile unit visiting all the rural areas in Sullia taluk.

The students here are going to their high school studies either Chokkadi High School Kukkujadka or G H S Duggaladka or G H S Elimale. Some are going to schools in Sullia also.  Early it is the Mandala Panchayath centre to Ubaradka, Nellur Kemraje and Amaramudnooru villages. But now for all works people are going to Sullia.
It is nearly 12 km away from Sullia.

To reach this place there are frequent buses from K S R T C bus stand Sullia . You can see this place while going in Jalsoor Subramanya Road.  This is nearly 27 km away from Kukke Subramanya.
From here you can go to Kukkujadka by Doddathota-Pajapalla PMGSY road. It connecting Amaramudnooru village with Kalmadka, Balila, Bellare and Amarapadnooru. This is the junction of three roads. Doddathota-Pajapalla PMGSY road, Doddathota-Markanja PMGSY road and Jalsoor Subramanya Road.

References 

Villages in Dakshina Kannada district